Rahe Chardi Kala Punjab Di is a 2012 Punjabi drama film starring Jimmy Sharma Dakssh Ajit Singh Shakti Kapoor, Sharad Saxena, Prabhleen Sandhu, Sapna Thakur. Directed and written by Shapinder Saini and produced by Jasvir Singh Sidhu the film released 25 May 2012.

Cast
 Jimmy Sharma as Saroop
 Prabhleen Sandhu as Zeba
 Dakssh Ajit Singh as Dalbir Singh
 Sapna Thakur
 Shakti Kapoor as taari bhaji
 Sharat Saxena as minister

Soundtrack

References

External links
 Rahe Chardi Kala Punjab Di Preview
 Stars Speak about film
 Rahe Chardi Kala Punjab Di Page at CinemaPunjabi.com

2012 films
Punjabi-language Indian films
2010s Punjabi-language films